Chhora Ganga Kinare Wala (Hindi: छोरा गंगा किनारे वाला) is a 2015 Indian, Bhojpuri language film directed by Rajkumar R. Pandey and produced by Dhirendra Choubey and associate directed by Manoj R Pandey, It stars Pradeep Pandey "Chintu", Kushi Bhat (debut), Ravi Kishan, Rinku Ghosh, Vinay Anand, Awdhesh Mishra and Sanjay Pandey.

Cast
Pradeep Pandey "Chintu"
Khushi Bhat
Ravi Kishan
Rinku Ghosh
Vinay Anand
Awdhesh Mishra
Sanjay Pandey
Brijesh Tripathi

Soundtrack

 Chhora Ganga Kinare Wala (Title Track) -
 Tohake Dekhale Bina -
 Rupaiye Me Chumma Sarkar Mangela -
 Pyar Mat Kara -
 Meri Jane Ja -
 Mauga Marad Ba -
 Mach Jaai Sagro Halla Goriya -
 Khol Ke Dikha Da Saman Kaisan Bitar Ba -
 Kahawa E Pyar Le Aail Ho -
 Chala Bolawale Asha Ram -

References

External links
 

Indian action films
2010s Hindi-language films
2015 action films
Films directed by Rajkumar R. Pandey
2010s Bhojpuri-language films
2015 multilingual films
Indian multilingual films